Kris Stewart (born February 9, 1967 in Portsmouth) is the founding chairman of English football club AFC Wimbledon and a left wing political activist. He was the club's chief executive and is also a CIMA past finalist management accountant. Under his leadership, AFC Wimbledon achieved numerous milestones including their first ever match, a friendly against Sutton United, as well as their first competitive game in the Combined Counties League away at Sandhurst, and a sell-out game against Chipstead at Kingsmeadow. He is a former member of the Socialist Workers Party (SWP) and stood as the Left List's candidate for Merton and Wandsworth in the 2008 London Assembly election.

In 2013, he resigned from the SWP due to the party's rape scandal and co-founded the International Socialist Network with around 100 other former members.

References

1967 births
Living people
English football chairmen and investors
AFC Wimbledon
Businesspeople from Portsmouth
Socialist Workers Party (UK) members